In differential geometry, constant-mean-curvature (CMC) surfaces are surfaces with constant mean curvature. This includes minimal surfaces as a subset, but typically they are treated as special case.

Note that these surfaces are generally different from constant Gaussian curvature surfaces, with the important exception of the sphere.

History
In 1841 Delaunay proved that the only surfaces of revolution with constant mean curvature were the surfaces obtained by rotating the roulettes of the conics. These are the plane, cylinder, sphere, the catenoid, the unduloid and nodoid.

Based on this H. Hopf conjectured in 1956 that any immersed compact orientable constant mean curvature hypersurface in must be a standard embedded  sphere. In 1984 Henry C. Wente constructed the Wente torus, an immersion into  of a torus with constant mean curvature.

Up until this point it had seemed that CMC surfaces were rare; new techniques produced a plethora of examples. In particular gluing methods appear to allow combining CMC surfaces fairly arbitrarily. Delaunay surfaces can also be combined with immersed "bubbles", retaining their CMC properties.

Korevaar, Kusner and Solomon proved that a complete embedded CMC surface will have ends asymptotic to unduloids. Each end carries a  "force" along the asymptotic axis of the unduloid (where n is the circumference of the necks), the sum of which must be balanced for the surface to exist. Current work involves classification of families of embedded CMC surfaces in terms of their moduli spaces. At most k − 2 ends can be cylindrical.

Generation methods

Representation formula
Like for minimal surfaces, there exist a close link to harmonic functions. An oriented surface  in  has constant mean curvature if and only if its Gauss map is a harmonic map. Kenmotsu’s representation formula is the counterpart to the Weierstrass–Enneper parameterization of minimal surfaces:

Suppose  is a harmonic function into the Riemann sphere. If  then  defined by

with

For  and  this produces the sphere.  and  gives a cylinder where .

Conjugate cousin method

CMC Tori
Hitchin, Pinkall, Sterling and Bobenko showed that all constant mean curvature immersions of a 2-torus into the space forms  and  can be described in purely algebro-geometric data. This can be extended to a subset of CMC immersions of the plane which are of finite type.

Discrete numerical methods
Discrete differential geometry can be used to produce approximations to CMC surfaces (or discrete counterparts), typically by minimizing a suitable energy functional.

Applications
CMC surfaces are natural for representations of soap bubbles, since they have the curvature corresponding to a nonzero pressure difference.

Besides macroscopic bubble surfaces CMC surfaces are relevant for the shape of the gas–liquid interface on a superhydrophobic surface.

Like triply periodic minimal surfaces there has been interest in periodic CMC surfaces as models for block copolymers where the different components have a nonzero interfacial energy or tension. CMC analogs to the periodic minimal surfaces have been constructed, producing unequal partitions of space. CMC structures have been observed in ABC triblock copolymers.

In architecture CMC surfaces are relevant for air-supported structures such as inflatable domes and enclosures, as well as a source of flowing organic shapes.

See also
 Double bubble conjecture
 Free surface
 Minimal surface

References

External links
 CMC surfaces at the Scientific Graphics Project 
 GeometrieWerkstatt surface gallery 
 GANG gallery of CMC surfaces 
 Noid, software for computing n-noid CMC surfaces 

Differential geometry of surfaces